Klovholt is a village in Skien municipality, Norway in the county of Telemark. It is located at the southern tip of the lake Norsjø.

Klovholt is heavy wooded and one of its major exports is timber.

From 1837 Klovholt was administratively a part of Solum municipality. Solum became a part of Skien municipality on 1 January 1964.

References 

Villages in Vestfold og Telemark